Torreon is the name of some places in the U.S. state of New Mexico:
Torreon, Sandoval County, New Mexico
Torreon, Torrance County, New Mexico